The 1977 FIVB Women's World Cup was held from 8 to 15 November 1977 in Japan.

Teams

Results

First round

Pool A

|}

|}

Pool B

|}

|}

Final round

5th–8th places

|}

|}

Final places
Location: Osaka

|}

|}

Final standing

Awards

 Most Valuable Player
  Takako Shirai
 Best Attacker
  Mercedes Pomares
 Best Blocker
  Cao Huiying
 Best Setter
  Noriko Matsuda

 Best Server
  Yumi Egami
 Best Defender
  Jo Hea-jung
 Best Coach
  Shigeo Yamada
 Spirit of Fight
  Cao Huiying

External links
 Results

1977 Women's
Women's World Cup
V
November 1977 sports events in Asia
Women's volleyball in Japan